"Dancing in the City" is a song by British pop-rock duo Marshall Hain, which was a No.3 hit in the UK in 1978. On its first release it spent fifteen weeks in the UK charts. It was a massive hit in South Africa, reaching the No.1 position on 3 November 1978, and holding that position for three weeks on the Springbok Charts. A re-mixed version released in 1987 reached No.81 on the UK charts.

Charts

Weekly charts

Year-end charts

"Dancin' in the City '87"

References

External links
 

1978 songs
1978 singles
Harvest Records singles